Nannette L. Whaley (born January 23, 1976) is an American politician who served as the 56th mayor of Dayton, Ohio from 2014 to 2022. A member of the Democratic Party, she was first elected to the mayorship in November 2013, after she served on the city commission for two terms. Whaley presided over the United States Conference of Mayors from 2021 to 2022. She was the Democratic nominee in the 2022 Ohio gubernatorial election, losing to incumbent Mike DeWine in a landslide.

Early life and education
Whaley grew up in Indiana, but she has lived in Ohio since attending the University of Dayton from 1994 to 1998, where she earned a bachelor's degree in chemistry. In college, Whaley was the Ohio chair of the College Democrats of America. Whaley is also a four-time delegate to the Democratic National Convention, worked for John Kerry's presidential campaign, and served as a presidential elector. Whaley later earned a Master of Public Administration in urban studies from Wright State University.

Career
Whaley was first elected to the Dayton City Commission in 2005, Whaley was one of the youngest women ever chosen for a commission seat. Whaley served on the Montgomery County Board of Elections and as a deputy to Montgomery County Auditor Karl Keith. Whaley was elected mayor of Dayton in 2013, winning 56 percent of the vote. In 2017, she was unopposed for reelection, making it the first uncontested mayoral race in the city's history since voters have elected the office separately. Before her election as Mayor she served on Greater Ohio's Community Revitalization Committee, the Learn to Earn Executive Committee for Education, the Montgomery County Planning Commission and the Dayton Access Television Board of Trustees.

Mayor of Dayton

Economic development 
Early in her time in office, Whaley founded the Dayton Region Manufacturing Task Force, which is "a regional effort committed to advocating for manufacturing and promoting a strong manufacturing workforce." Initiatives like this and a surge of high tech and research jobs have spurred $600,000,000 in investment in the region. Since Whaley was sworn into office on January 4, 2014, the unemployment rate in the City of Dayton has declined from 9.3% to 5.7%. In 2015, Site Selection magazine named Dayton, which has strong economic ties to the nearby Wright-Patterson Air Force Base, the overall second-best mid-sized city for new business expansion projects in the nation.

Opioids 
In response to a statewide surge in opioid-related drug overdoses, Whaley declared a citywide state of emergency and developed a needle exchange program. Dayton also began to ensure that first-responders had access to the overdose-reversal drug naloxone. Whaley has been consistently critical of the Government of Ohio for failing to adequately fund opioid treatment and recovery programs. In 2017, Dayton was the fourth city in the country to sue the pharmaceutical companies, opioid drug distributors and physicians they say are responsible for Ohio's opioid addiction and overdose crisis.

City of Learners and the Preschool Promise 
The City of Learners initiative was launched by Whaley in early 2014 as a citywide effort to support Dayton's schools and students. A committee of community leaders and volunteers identified five areas of community focus: ensure all children attend a high quality school, ensure high quality preschool is offered to all children, increase business partnerships with schools, provide mentors to more children, and expand sites for after school and summer learning.

In 2016, the City of Dayton voters passed a 0.25% income tax increase to support critical city services and to offer 1 year of affordable, quality Preschool to all Dayton families with a 4-year-old. This move institutionalized Preschool Promise in Dayton and provides sustained funding.

Downtown revitalization 
Whaley has placed significant emphasis on reviving the economy and culture of the Downtown Dayton area. She has done so through drawing in over $200,000,000 in downtown investments and in a refocus of the region into new ventures; she has focused especially on the Arcade Building. As a result of some new renewal efforts, new businesses have begun to move into the downtown area, including a number of small businesses and startups.

Accessibility 
As a previous board member of the Bike Walk Dayton Committee, Whaley has taken significant steps towards making Dayton a bicycle friendly community. For instance, her administration oversaw the implementation of Dayton's first Bike Share program. She is also a strong advocate for a county-wide landbank system to address the region's housing crisis with a more regional approach and serves on the Montgomery County Landbank Board.

2019 mass shooting 

After a mass shooting occurred on August 4, 2019, she and Ohio Senator Sherrod Brown accompanied President Donald Trump on a visit with survivors at the local hospital. Ten people were killed, including the perpetrator; and twenty-seven were injured. She joined over 200 mayors in encouraging Congress to act on gun control legislation that is already before them. The group included Dee Margo, the mayor of El Paso, Texas,  where a shooting occurred the day before. According to Dayton NAACP President Derrick Foward, Whaley received the Dayton Unit NAACP Community Service Award for the leadership she provided in guiding the City of Dayton through the violent and horrific mass shooting that took place in the Historic Oregon District.

Gubernatorial elections

2018 

Ahead of the 2018 election cycle, Whaley considered a run for Congress before declaring her candidacy for governor of Ohio. On May 8, 2017, Whaley announced that she was running for governor in the 2018 election on a platform of job creation. She dropped out of the race on January 12, 2018, and endorsed Richard Cordray.

2022 

On April 19, 2021, Whaley announced her candidacy in the 2022 Ohio gubernatorial election. She faced former Cincinnati Mayor John Cranley for the Democratic nomination to be Governor of Ohio. On May 3, Whaley won the Democratic primary election and became the Democratic nominee for Ohio Governor. This made her the first woman to win a major party nomination to run for governor of Ohio and, because she was running with Cheryl Stephens, part of the first all-female ticket nominated by a major party for governor and lieutenant governor in that state. Whaley and Stephens lost the race to incumbent Mike DeWine getting 37.2% of votes to DeWine's 62.8%. Whaley gave her concession speech on November 8th 2022 in Dayton Ohio.

Personal life 
She is a member of Corpus Christi Catholic Church and a graduate of Leadership Miami Valley.  In 1998, she settled in the Five Oaks neighborhood where she and her husband Sam reside today.

References

External links

Nan Whaley for Ohio campaign website
Twitter account

|-

1976 births
Living people
Ohio Democrats
Mayors of Dayton, Ohio
University of Dayton alumni
Wright State University alumni
People from Mooresville, Indiana
Women mayors of places in Ohio
21st-century American politicians
21st-century American women politicians
Presidents of the United States Conference of Mayors
Candidates in the 2022 United States elections